This list of Duke University people includes alumni, faculty, presidents, and major philanthropists of Duke University, which includes three undergraduate and ten graduate schools.  The undergraduate schools include Trinity College of Arts and Sciences, Pratt School of Engineering, Sanford School of Public Policy, and Duke Kunshan University. The university's graduate and professional schools include the Graduate School, the Pratt School of Engineering, the Nicholas School of the Environment, the School of Medicine, the School of Nursing, the Fuqua School of Business, the School of Law, the Divinity School, the Sanford School of Public Policy, and Duke Kunshan University.

Famous alumni include U.S. President Richard Nixon; Chilean President Ricardo Lagos; former cabinet member and former Senator Elizabeth Dole; philanthropist Melinda French Gates; the chief executive officers of Apple (Tim Cook), Procter and Gamble (David S. Taylor), Bear Stearns (Alan Schwartz), Morgan Stanley (John J. Mack), Pfizer (Edmund T. Pratt, Jr.), McDonald's (Chris Kempczinski) and General Motors Corporation (Rick Wagoner); and the first United States Chief Performance Officer Jeffrey Zients. Notable alumni media personalities include Dan Abrams, the former general manager of MSNBC; Jay Bilas, a commentator on ESPN; Sean McManus, the president of CBS News and CBS Sports; Charlie Rose, the former host of his eponymous PBS talk show and a 60 Minutes contributor; and Judy Woodruff, an anchor at CNN. William DeVries (GME 1971–79) was the first doctor to perform a successful permanent artificial heart implantation, and appeared on the cover of Time in 1984.

Current notable faculty include Manny Azenberg, a Broadway producer whose productions have won 40 Tony Awards; Adrian Bejan, namesake of the Bejan number; and David Brooks, a columnist for The New York Times. Walter E. Dellinger III, formerly the United States Solicitor General, Assistant Attorney General, and head of the Office of Legal Counsel under Bill Clinton, serves as a law professor. Novelist and playwright Ariel Dorfman won the 1992 Laurence Olivier Award, while Peter Feaver was a member of the National Security Council under Clinton and George W. Bush. David Gergen served as an advisor to Presidents Richard Nixon, Gerald Ford, Ronald Reagan, and Bill Clinton. John Hope Franklin was awarded the Presidential Medal of Freedom by Bill Clinton, while William Raspberry, a syndicated columnist for The Washington Post, won the Pulitzer Prize in 1994. 15 Nobel Prize winners have been associated with the university.

International academic prizes

Nobel laureates

As of 2019, 15 Nobel laureates have been affiliated with Duke University. The following list includes only those who have graduated from Duke or spent at least one year as a postdoctoral researcher/medical resident/visiting professor or two years as a faculty member at Duke.

Turing Award laureates
In the absence of a Nobel Prize in Computer science, the Turing Award generally is recognized as the highest honor in the subject and the "Nobel Prize of computing". As of 2015, 3 Turing Award laureates have been affiliated with Duke University.
Frederick P. Brooks (A.B. 1953), software engineer and computer scientist, known for managing the development of IBM's System/360 family of computers; National Medal of Technology and Innovation laureate in 1985, IEEE John von Neumann Medal laureate in 1993 and Turing Award laureate in 1999
Edmund M. Clarke (M.A. 1968; faculty, 1976 to 1978), computer scientist; academic; developed model checking; Turing Award laureate in 2007
John Cocke (B.S. 1945, Ph.D. 1956), considered the father of the RISC computer architecture, Turing Award laureate in 1987, National Medal of Technology and Innovation laureate in 1991 and National Medal of Science in 1994

Alumni

Government, law, and public policy
Note: individuals who belong in multiple sections appear in the most relevant section.

Heads of state
Ricardo Lagos (Ph.D. 1966), former President of Chile 
Richard Nixon (J.D. 1937), 37th President of the United States

Cabinet members and White House staff

Members of Congress

U.S. senators

U.S. representatives

Governors

Diplomats

Military

Law

Judges

Attorneys

Public policy

Mayors

State officials

Foreign officials

Foreign royalty
Hashim bin Al Hussein (X), Prince of Jordan
Sheikha Al-Mayassa bint Hamad bin Khalifa Al-Thani (B.A. 2005), 14th child of Sheikh Hamad bin Khalifa Al Thani, the former Emir of Qatar
Sheikha Hind bint Hamad bin Khalifa Al Thani, daughter of Sheikh Hamad bin Khalifa Al Thani
Prince Charles-Henri de Lobkowicz (B.A.), third son of Prince Edouard de Lobkowicz and Princess Marie-Françoise of Bourbon-Parma

Other

Business

Education

University presidents and administrators

Professors and academics

History
William Baskerville Hamilton

Medicine, science and technology

Literature

Fine arts

Entertainment

Journalism and media

Athletics
See also men's basketball players, women's basketball players, and football players.

American football

Baseball

Basketball

Golf

Other

Fictional

Faculty

Current

Former

Men's basketball head coaches

Football head coaches

Duke University presidents

Major philanthropists
Donors who have contributed at least $20 million to the university or founding donors:

References

External links
Duke University

 
People
Duke University people